Dyektiyek (Ĵekĵiyek) is a rural locality (a selo) and the administrative centre of Dyektiyeksky Rural Settlement, Shebalinsky District, the Altai Republic, Russia. The population was 593 as of 2016. There are 18 streets.

Geography 
Dyektiyek is located 7 km southwest of Shebalino (the district's administrative centre) by road. Shebalino is the nearest rural locality.

References 

Rural localities in Shebalinsky District